The Sound City Players were a supergroup formed by ex-Nirvana drummer and Foo Fighters guitarist and lead-singer Dave Grohl. They consisted in a collaboration of Grohl with Krist Novoselic ex-Nirvana, Stone Sour's and Slipknot's Corey Taylor, Nine Inch Nails' Trent Reznor, Josh Homme from Queens of the Stone Age, Rick Nielsen from Cheap Trick, Rick Springfield, Stevie Nicks, Alain Johannes, Paul McCartney, and many more.

History

The first public word of Sound City was when Paul McCartney performed with the surviving members of Nirvana: Grohl, Novoselic and Smear live at the 12-12-12: The Concert for Sandy Relief in New York. Together they premiered the collaborative song "Cut Me Some Slack". Grohl then revealed his plans for the Sound City film and soundtrack. McCartney and the surviving members of Nirvana performed the song a second time the following week on Saturday Night Live.

Grohl then formed the Sound City Players with many of the musicians who appeared in his film Sound City about the recently closed Sound City Studios in Van Nuys, California. Their debut was at the Sundance Film Festival's Park City Live on January 18, 2013.

Grohl and seven other band members, including Nicks on lead vocals, appeared on Late Night with David Letterman on February 14, 2013. The Sound City Players appeared on Jimmy Kimmel Live on March 5, 2013 and on Ellen on March 7, 2013. Grohl promised that their final show was the concert at the SXSW music festival on March 14, 2013.

Touring members

Varying musicians performed the live shows as the Sound City Players. These musicians included:

 Dave Grohl
 Krist Novoselic
 Pat Smear
 Paul McCartney
 Taylor Hawkins
 Alain Johannes
 Nate Mendel
 Chris Shiflett
 Rami Jaffee
 Jessy Greene    
 Chris Goss
 John Fogerty 
 Lee Ving 
 Stevie Nicks 
 Rick Nielsen
 Rick Springfield 
 Corey Taylor
 Brad Wilk
 Robert Levon Been 
 Peter Hayes

Discography
Sound City: Real to Reel (2013)

References

External links
 The Sound City Players official website on Facebook

2012 establishments in California
2013 disestablishments in California
Alternative rock groups from California
Dave Grohl
Musical groups disestablished in 2013
Musical groups established in 2012
Musical groups from Los Angeles
Rock music supergroups